Off to See the Lizard is the seventeenth studio album by American popular music singer-songwriter Jimmy Buffett.  Initially to be called Stranger than Fishing, it was released in June 1989 as MCA 6314 and was produced by Elliot Scheiner and Buffett.  The album is the first to feature much of the  Coral Reefer Band.  Following the release of this album, Buffett paused his normal output of one album every year or two and did not release another album until 1994's Fruitcakes.

Songs
All but one of the album's songs were written or co-written by Buffett.  "Mermaid in the Night" was written by Coral Reefer Band members Roger Guth and Jay Oliver.  "Boomerang Love" also appeared on the soundtrack to the 1989 movie Always.  Buffett recorded a live version of "The Pascagoula Run" for his 2003 greatest hits collection Meet Me in Margaritaville: The Ultimate Collection. Most of the songs are related to Jimmy's first book of stories, Tales from Margaritaville, released the same year.
A music video for 'Take Another Road' was filmed at the abandoned Islander Drive-In Theater on Stock Island, just outside of Key West, Florida.

Chart performance
Off to See the Lizard reached No. 57 on the Billboard 200 album chart.  The song "Take Another Road" hit No. 18 Adult Contemporary.

Track listing

Personnel
The Coral Reefer Band:
Jimmy Buffett – guitar, vocals
Jay Oliver – keyboards, percussion
Peter Mayer – guitars
Jim Mayer – bass
Roger Guth – drums
Robert Greenidge – steel drums
Michael Utley – organ
Greg "Fingers" Taylor – harmonica
Ralph MacDonald – percussion
"The Nuff Brothers" – Alan Rubin, Birch Johnson, Lou Marini – horns
Diana Canova, Sheryl Crow, Frank Floyd, Peter Mayer, Timothy B. Schmit – background singers

Singles
"Take Another Road" b/w "Off To See The Lizard" (7" single released on MCA 53675 in May 1989)
"Carnival World" b/w ? (cassette single released on MCA ?)

Tour
1989 brought yet another summer tour, with all the usual stops, but this time Jimmy had brought back the Neville Brothers for an opening act. In April, Jimmy played Jazz Fest for the first time, while December brought the mini "Buffett Does Ballads" Tour with Mac McAnally and Larry Knight in support of the new book Tales from Margaritaville.

Tour dates

1989 Coral Reefer Band
Jimmy Buffett: Vocals and guitar
Peter Mayer: Guitar
Jim Mayer: Bass
Roger Guth: Drums
Michael Utley: Piano
Greg “Fingers” Taylor – Harmonica, Background Vocals
Robert Greenidge: Steel Drums
Jay Oliver: Keyboards
Dena Iverson: Vocals

Set list
Every night "Carnival World" was the opener and "Volcano" was the set closer.  "Gravity Storm" and "A Pirate Looks at Forty" were played during the encore, with the latter closing the show.  More often than not, "Changing Channels" would be added to the set after "Pirate" and would end the show.  The Randy Newman cover "Louisiana 1927" was added to the set after "Pirate" for the Austin, TX show, its only appearance of the tour.

Average set list:
"Carnival World"
"Jolly Mon Sing"
"Grapefruit—Juicy Fruit
"Boat Drinks"
"Cheeseburger in Paradise"
"Off to See the Lizard"
"That's My Story and I'm Stickin' to It"
"Come Monday"
"Son of a Son of a Sailor"
"Changes in Latitudes, Changes in Attitudes"
"Why Don't We Get Drunk"
"Twelve Volt Man"
"He Went to Paris"
"Take Another Road"
"Boomerang Love"
"Margaritaville"
"Pencil Thin Mustache"
"Fins"
"Some White People Can Dance"
"Volcano"  Encore:
"Gravity Storm"
"A Pirate Looks at Forty"
"Changing Channels" (played about 4/7 of the time)

Notes

Jimmy Buffett albums
1989 albums
MCA Records albums